Kyara may refer to:

 Paul Henry Kyara, Tanzanian politician
 Kyara Stijns (born 1995), Dutch racing cyclist
 Kyara, a character in the video game Ururun Quest: Koiyuuki
 Kyara, a character in the Colombian TV series El capo
 Kyara, a village in Sirohi district, Rajasthan, India - see Battle of Kasahrada
 Kyara Tehsil, a Tehsil (administrative division) in Bareilly district, Uttar Pradesh, India
 Kyara (伽羅), in Japan the highest grade of agarwood
 "Kyara", a short story by Jirō Asada
 "Kyara", a character in the manga Usogui

See also
 Kiara (disambiguation)